The Daphoeninae are an extinct subfamily of dog-like, terrestrial carnivores, which belonged to the family Amphicyonidae of the suborder Caniformia.

Fossil distribution
Daphoenus fossils found in late Oligocene rocks in the Great Plains are dated about 28 million years old. Daphoenus survived to 27 Mya in the Pacific Northwest in the John Day beds of Oregon. Other sites include: Alachua County, Florida (Whitneyan) estimated at 31.1—24.3 Ma., Tecuya Canyon, California (Arikareean age) 30.8—20.6 Ma., Haystack Member Formation, Wheeler County, Oregon (Hemingfordian) 20.6—16.3 Mya, Lac Pelletier, Alberta, Canada (Duchesnean) around 42 Mya.

References

Bear dogs
Eocene carnivorans
Oligocene caniforms
Burdigalian extinctions
Prehistoric mammals of North America
White River Fauna
Rupelian first appearances